The 1997 Family Circle Cup was a women's tennis tournament played on outdoor clay courts at the Sea Pines Plantation on Hilton Head Island, South Carolina in the United States that was part of Tier I of the 1997 WTA Tour. It was the 25th edition of the tournament and was held from March 31 through April 6, 1997. Martina Hingis won the singles title.

Finals

Singles

 Martina Hingis defeated  Monica Seles 3–6, 6–3, 7–6
 It was Hingis' 8th title of the year and the 13th of her career.

Doubles

 Mary Joe Fernández /  Martina Hingis defeated  Lindsay Davenport /  Jana Novotná 7–5, 4–6, 6–1
 It was Fernández's 1st title of the year and the 24th of her career. It was Hingis' 9th title of the year and the 14th of her career.

References

External links
 WTA Tournament Profile

Family Circle Cup
Charleston Open
Family Circle Cup
Family Circle Cup
Family Circle Cup
Family Circle Cup